Katherine Hastings (née  Dudley), Countess of Huntingdon (c. 1538 or 1543–1545 – 14 August 1620) was an English noblewoman.

She was the youngest surviving daughter of John Dudley, 1st Duke of Northumberland and his wife, Jane Guildford, and a sister of Robert Dudley, Earl of Leicester, Elizabeth I's favourite.

Katherine Dudley was betrothed or married on 25 May 1553 at a very young age to Henry Hastings, the heir of Francis Hastings, 2nd Earl of Huntingdon. From her mother's will it appears that she was still under 12 years of age in January 1555, and a clause regarding her marriage implies that the match could still be dissolved: "if it so chance that my Lord Hastings do refuse her or she him".

By the spring of 1559 Katherine Hastings was definitely married, and on the death of her father-in-law in 1560 became Countess of Huntingdon. She remained childless, though she may have suffered a miscarriage in the spring of 1566. For many years she lived with her husband in the English Midlands and Yorkshire, where she dedicated herself to the education of young women of the nobility and gentry. Among her pupils were the diarist Margaret Hoby, memoirist Dionys Fitzherbert, and her brother Robert's stepdaughters, the sisters Penelope and Dorothy Devereux. Like her husband, the Countess was a convinced Protestant with Puritan leanings.

After the Earl of Huntingdon died at York in December 1595, she lived at court and became one of the closest friends of the old Queen. When young, she had suffered from Elizabeth's distrust of her husband's loyalty, which was nourished by his descent from the House of Plantagenet. She was in debt by £2400 and asked the Queen to help realise her jointure property in March 1597. She was attending the queen privately twice a day in February 1598. Her differences with the new earl, George Hastings, 4th Earl of Huntingdon, over her jointure and her husband's debts were settled on 15 February, and he would have the Savoy House.

Katherine, Countess of Huntingdon died at Chelsea, London on 14 August 1620, and was buried in her mother's tomb at Chelsea Old Church.

Ancestry

Citations

References
Adams, Simon (ed.) (1995): Household Accounts and Disbursement Books of Robert Dudley, Earl of Leicester, 1558–1561, 1584–1586 Cambridge University Press; 
Adams, Simon (2002): Leicester and the Court: Essays in Elizabethan Politics Manchester University Press; 
Cross, Claire (2008): "Hastings, Katherine, countess of Huntingdon (c.1538–1620)" Oxford Dictionary of National Biography online edn. Jan 2008 (subscription required) Retrieved 04-04-2010
Freedman, Sylvia (1983): Poor Penelope: Lady Penelope Rich. An Elizabethan Woman The Kensal Press; 

1540s births
1620 deaths
English countesses
Daughters of English dukes
16th-century English women
16th-century English nobility
17th-century English women
17th-century English nobility
Katherine Hastings, Countess of Huntingdon
Katherine Hastings, Countess of Huntingdon
Burials at Chelsea Old Church
Wives of knights